

Organizational History

Leeds International (Pvt) Ltd was originally established in 1999, with the inauguration of the Leeds International School in Panadura. At present, the group has 6 branches across Sri Lanka , with over 4000 in the total student population.

The main campus of LCBT is situated at No. 342 Kotte Road, Pitakotte, Sri Lanka and another branch at No. 320 Aguruwatota Road, Horana, Sri Lanka. The campus plans to initially start off with courses for engineering and sports, but would soon move into other business subjects (Management, HR, Accounting, IT, etc.).

The building of the Main Campus is five-storied, with facilities such as a lift, generators, internet, 90 channels of TV, a modern computer laboratory, a science lab, an auditorium, a library, and a performing arts studio.

Campuses
 Colombo(Kotte)
 Panadura
 Horana Business Campus

References

Business schools in Sri Lanka